Mountain Mover is the eighth studio album by Bryn Haworth.

It was recorded in August 1985 at the Chapel Lane Studios, Hereford was produced by Bryn Haworth, engineered by Laurence Burrage and released by Word Records (UK) on the Myrrh Label as MYRR 1204.

Track listing

 "Mountain Mover"
 "Forever in Love"
 "Reeling and Rocking"
 "Slipping and Falling"
 "Land of the Living"
 "Teach Me Your Way"
 "Victory Song"
 "Making The Most of What You've Got"
 "Saturday Morning"
 "Nature of Man"

Personnel 

Bryn Haworth - guitar, mandolin, vocals
Henry Spinetti - drums, percussion
Dave Markee - bass
Chris Stainton - piano, keyboards
Mel Collins - saxophone, horns
Jeff Hammer - synthesizer

(album now deleted)

1985 albums
Bryn Haworth albums